Coppin Academy High School is a public charter high school located in Baltimore, Maryland, United States. Opened in July 2005, it is located directly on the campus of Coppin State University and is operated by Coppin State.

The student body is composed of approximately 350 students, all chosen by lottery. Once there, the students are afforded the opportunity to interact with and learn from college students and professors from Coppin State.

See also
 Coppin State University

References

External links
 
 Coppin Academy – Maryland Report Card

Public schools in Baltimore
Public high schools in Maryland
Charter schools in Maryland